Paolo Casarin (born 12 May 1940 in Venice) is a retired football referee from Italy.
He is mostly known for supervising two matches in the 1982 FIFA World Cup in Spain and overseeing rules and regulations throughout Europe.

Growing up in Mestre, near Venice, Casarin became a referee in 1958 and in 1979, he was appointed as an international referee.
He officiated at UEFA Euro 1988, in addition to several matches in the 1982 and 1986 World Cup qualifiers.

He retired from refereeing in 1988 and in 2012, he was inducted into the Italian Football Hall of Fame.

References
Profile

1940 births
Italian football referees
FIFA World Cup referees
Living people
1982 FIFA World Cup referees
Sportspeople from the Metropolitan City of Venice
UEFA Euro 1988 referees